Kurt Müller (born 4 April 1934) is a Swiss sport shooter. He won a bronze medal in the men's 300 m rifle, 3 positions at the 1968 Summer Olympics in Mexico City.

References

1934 births
Living people
Swiss male sport shooters
Shooters at the 1960 Summer Olympics
Shooters at the 1964 Summer Olympics
Shooters at the 1968 Summer Olympics
Olympic shooters of Switzerland
Olympic bronze medalists for Switzerland
Olympic medalists in shooting
Medalists at the 1968 Summer Olympics
People from Lucerne-Land District
Sportspeople from the canton of Lucerne
20th-century Swiss people